Women in Shakespeare is a topic within the especially general discussion of Shakespeare's dramatic and poetic works. Main characters such as Dark Lady of the sonnets have elicited a substantial amount of criticism, which received added impetus during the second-wave feminism of the 1960s. A considerable number of book-length studies and academic articles investigate the topic, and several moons of Uranus are named after women in Shakespeare.

In Shakespeare's tragedies and his plays in general, there are several types of female characters. They influence other characters, but are also often underestimated. Women in Shakespearean plays have always had important roles, sometimes the leading role. Whether they are there to change the story or stabilize it, they are there for a reason. Some women are stronger than others, and their effect on the play is different for each one. They often surpass the male heroes.

Historiography

19th-century criticism 

Early criticism of female characters in Shakespeare's drama focused on the positive attributes the dramatist bestows on them and often claimed that Shakespeare realistically captured the "essence" of femininity. Helen Zimmern, in the preface to the English translation of Louis Lewes's study The Women of Shakespeare, argued in 1895 that "of Shakespeare's dramatis personae, his women are perhaps the most attractive, and also, in a sense, his most original creations, so different are they, as a whole, from the ideals of the feminine type prevalent in the literature of his day."
Lewes himself strikes a similar tone of praise in his conclusion: "The poet's magic wand has laid open the depths of woman's nature, wherein, beside lovely and exquisite emotion, terrible passions play their dangerous and fatal part."

This early period of women in Shakespeare, which ends in the beginning of the twentieth century, is characterised by a very conventional tone and treatment and the confirmation of female submission. The editors of a 1983 collection called The Woman's Part, referencing three books by women authors from the 19th century (an authoritative book, Shakespeare's Heroines: Characteristics of Women by Anna Jameson, originally published 1832, and two fictional biographies in novel form of two of Shakespeare's heroines from 1885) conclude that these early critics are "uneasy" when Shakespeare's heroines behave "unwomanly", and that adaptations of their stories "praise girlish sweetness and modesty in a style that today appears effusive." These are, they say, "culturally induced limitations" on the part of the female critics and authors studying and adapting Shakespeare's women.

Modern criticism 

Recent critics take a variety of approaches to the topic. For feminist critics influenced by French feminism, the analysis of the female body in Shakespeare's plays has proven fruitful. Carol Chillington Rutter, author of Enter the Body: Women and Representation on Shakespeare's Stage (2001), focuses for instance on the body of Cordelia, as her father, King Lear, carries her on to the stage; on the body of Ophelia in the grave; and on the bodies of the two women on the bed at the end of Othello, "a play that destroys women."

Notable female characters 

 Adriana, in The Comedy of Errors
 Beatrice, in Much Ado About Nothing
 Bianca, in The Taming of the Shrew
 Celia, in As You Like It
 Cleopatra, in Antony and Cleopatra
 Cordelia, in King Lear
 Cressida, in Troilus and Cressida
 Desdemona, in Othello
 Emilia, in Othello
 Gertrude, in Hamlet
 Goneril, in King Lear
 Hermia, in A Midsummer Night's Dream
 Helena, in A Midsummer Night's Dream
 Helena, in All's Well that Ends Well
 Hero, in Much Ado About Nothing
 Hermione, in The Winter's Tale
 Hippolyta, in A Midsummer Night's Dream
 Imogen, in Cymbeline
 Isabella, in Measure for Measure
 Julia, in The Two Gentlemen of Verona
 Juliet, in Romeo and Juliet
 Katherina, in The Taming of the Shrew
 Lady Macbeth, in Macbeth
 Lavinia Andronicus, in Titus Andronicus
 Miranda, in The Tempest
 Margaret of Anjou, in Henry VI Part 1, Part 2, Part 3 and Richard III
 Olivia, in Twelfth Night
 Ophelia, in Hamlet
 Portia, in The Merchant of Venice
 The Princess of France, in Love's Labour's Lost
 Paulina, in The Winter's Tale
 Perdita, in The Winter's Tale
 Regan, in King Lear
 Rosalind, in As You Like It
 Rosaline (only referenced), in "Romeo and Juliet"
 Tamora, in Titus Andronicus
 Three Witches, in Macbeth
 Titania, in A Midsummer Night's Dream
 Viola, in Twelfth Night
 Volumnia, in Coriolanus

References

Bibliography 
 
 
 Dlugosch, Tom (2019). Women of Resolve: Female Characters in plays attributed to Shakespeare. Amazon Kindle. ASIN : B084DQTLKR

External links 
 
 

William Shakespeare
Feminism